Ronald Gerald Wayne (born May 17, 1934) is a retired American electronics industry businessman. He co-founded Apple Computer Company (now Apple Inc.) as a partnership with Steve Wozniak and Steve Jobs on April 1, 1976, providing administrative oversight and documentation for the new venture.

Early life and education
Wayne was born in Cleveland, Ohio, United States on May 17, 1934.

Career
In 1956, aged 22, he moved to California. In 1971, Wayne started his first business which sold slot machines. The company failed. Wayne reflected in 2014 that, "I discovered very quickly that I had no business being in business. I was far better working in engineering."

Apple
In 1976, Wayne built the internal corporate documentation systems at the three-year-old Atari, when he met coworkers Steve Jobs and Steve Wozniak. To help settle one of their typical intense discussions about the design of computers and the future of the industry, Wayne invited the two to his home to facilitate and advise them. In the ensuing two-hour conversation about technology and business, Jobs proposed the founding of a computer company led by  Wozniak and himself. The two would each hold a 45% stake so that Wayne could receive a 10% stake to act as a tie-breaker in their decisions. As the venture's self-described "adult in the room" at age 41, Wayne wrote a partnership agreement, and the three founded Apple Computer on April 1, 1976. Wayne illustrated the first Apple logo and wrote the Apple I manual.

Wayne's business attitude was already risk-averse due to his experience five years prior with the "very traumatic" failure of his slot machine business, the debt of which he had spent one year voluntarily repaying. Jobs secured a  line of credit to buy product materials for Apple's first order which had been placed by The Byte Shop whose reputation as a notoriously slow-paying vendor gave Wayne great concern for his future. Legally, all members of a partnership are personally responsible for any debts incurred by any partner; unlike Jobs and Wozniak, then 21 and 25, Wayne had personal assets that potential creditors could possibly seize. Furthermore, his passion was in original product engineering and in slot machines, and not in the documentation systems he assumed Jobs and Wozniak probably wanted him to do indefinitely at Apple. Believing he was "standing in the shadow of giants" of product-design talent and avoiding financial risk, he quit the company. This period of time however has been disputed by Steve Wozniak, who in an interview said that Wayne left the company after a few months.

Wayne has stated in following decades that he does not regret selling his share of the company, as he made the "best decision with the information available to me at the time". He said he had originally believed that the Apple enterprise "would be successful, but at the same time there would be significant bumps along the way and I couldn't risk it. I had already had a rather unfortunate business experience before. I was getting too old and those two were whirlwinds. It was like having a tiger by the tail and I couldn't keep up with these guys." Although Apple ended up at one point becoming the most valuable company in the world, he said that with the stress of staying with Apple he "probably would have wound up the richest man in the cemetery." He summarized, "What can I say? You make a decision based on your understanding of the circumstances, and you live with it."

After Apple
Shortly after leaving Apple, Wayne resisted Jobs's attempts to get him to return, remaining at Atari until 1978, when he joined Lawrence Livermore National Laboratory and later an electronics company in Salinas, California.

In the late 1970s, Wayne ran a stamp shop in Milpitas, California, for a short time. After a number of break-ins, he moved his stamp operations to his home.

Steve Jobs approached him again as a business contact for Apple, but Wayne refused to even forward Jobs's proposal to purchase a friend's company. Wayne's principle was that his friend should retain ownership under exclusive license to Apple instead of selling, but he would later express regret for having blocked the contact instead of allowing the decision to be made directly.

In 2011, the contract was sold at auction for $1.6 million. Wayne has stated that he regrets that sale.

Circa 2004, aged 70, Wayne claimed he was robbed of his life savings, which he kept in a strongbox in his home. Amongst the assets he held was 145 ounces of gold (~$247,000 as of November 2022) and $3,000 worth of silver coins; the precious metals were never recovered. To cover expenses, Wayne was compelled to sell his house and retire to a mobile home park in Pahrump, Nevada, where he sells stamps and rare coins, and plays penny slots at a casino; he later sold off old Apple memorabilia to collectors to pay off bills. Wayne never owned an Apple product until 2011, when he was given an iPad 2 at the Update Conference in Brighton, England. He holds a dozen patents.

Media
In July 2011, Wayne published a memoir titled Adventures of an Apple Founder. His plan for initial exclusivity on the Apple Books store did not materialize. He wrote a socioeconomic treatise titled Insolence of Office, released on October 1, 2011 (four days prior to the death of Steve Jobs), which he describes as this:

He appeared in the documentary Welcome to Macintosh in 2008, where he describes some of his early experiences with Jobs and Wozniak.

References

External links

 
 Ron Wayne interview by OMT
 NPR report "Lost" Apple Founder Has No Regrets – June 13, 2010
 Ron Wayne, Apple Co-Founder, Shares Steve Jobs' "Richest Man in the Cemetery" Sentiment Almost Verbatim , Village Voice, October 8, 2011
 

1934 births
Living people
Apple Inc. employees
Apple Inc. executives
Businesspeople from Cleveland
High School of Art and Design alumni
People from Pahrump, Nevada